Tom Doak is a golf course architect. He has 6 courses ranked among the top 100 in the world according to the "Top 100 Courses in the World" March 2021 list compiled by Golf Magazine. These include Pacific Dunes in Oregon, Ballyneal in Colorado, Barnbougle Dunes in Tasmania and Cape Kidnappers in New Zealand. Doak lives in Michigan.

He was a student of golf course designer Pete Dye, although perhaps his greatest influence comes from Alister MacKenzie (whom Doak wrote a book about), designer of Cypress Point, Royal Melbourne, and consultant to Bobby Jones at Augusta National.  In 2007, Doak restored Alister MacKenzie's home course, Pasatiempo, a Golf Magazine Top 100 course located in Santa Cruz, California.

Doak is the author of The Confidential Guide to Golf Courses which is a guide to famous and obscure golf courses around the world. The original version of the book was intended for a select group of friends and golf course architects. The sanitized version became a coffee table book which also included Doak's photography. Despite being toned down, the book includes several extremely critical reviews of golf courses and alienated several well-regarded golf course architects. For example, in his entry for Talamore Golf Club in Pinehurst, North Carolina, designed by Rees Jones, Doak wrote that the "dull layout" made him "want to spit."

Education
Doak attended Cornell University after a semester at MIT where he studied Design and Landscape Architecture. After graduating Cornell, he won the Dreer Award from the Department of Floriculture and Horticulture.  He used the Dreer Award to travel to Great Britain and Ireland, between 1982 and 1983, to study their best golf courses.  He caddied at St. Andrews during the summer of 1982.

Career
Doak is a "minimalist" designer. Minimalism is a school of golf design that focuses on concentrating the design of a golf hole (or routing) around the natural features of the land.  His most successful courses have been built on sand dunes, taking advantage of the sandy soil for drainage and also allowing for the reuse of native elements.

Doak's first course, High Pointe Golf Club near Williamsburg, Michigan, opened in 1989. The course closed in 2008 and is expected to reopen in 2024.

Doak credits most of his accomplishments and success to golf course designer Pete Dye.  Doak worked with Dye to learn how to construct golf courses during graduate school.  Doak was exposed to several different schools of design on multiple continents in a variety of conditions.  Jim Urbina taught him how to run a bulldozer allowing Doak to think in three dimensions and how to use the materials around him.

In 2015 he announced he would spend a significant amount of time during the ensuing few years, researching for a new edition of his book, The Confidential Guide to Golf Courses.

Books
Doak has written four books about Golf Course Design:

The Anatomy of a Golf Course Independent Book Publisher | Publish | Book Publisher   (1992).
The Confidential Guide to Golf Courses  (1996)
The Life and Work of Dr. Alister MacKenzie New Pop Music, Pop Music Videos, Pop News - Clock Tower  (2001) by Tom Doak, James S. Scott, Raymund M. Haddock, Ray Haddock, and James Scott
Tom Doak's Little Red Book of Golf Course Architecture (2017)
Getting to 18 (2020)
The Making of Pacific Dunes (2021)

Courses

Public and resort courses
 Aetna Springs Golf Club; Pope Valley, CA; Closed
 Apache Stronghold Golf Club; Globe, AZ; Closed
 Atlantic City Country Club; Northfield, NJ
 Barnbougle Dunes Golf Links; Bridport, Tasmania, Australia
 Beechtree Golf Club; Aberdeen, MD; Closed
 Black Forest at Wilderness Valley; Gaylord, MI Closed
 Cabot Highlands, Scotland (Future)
 Cape Kidnappers Resort; Napier New Zealand
 Charlotte Golf Links; Charlotte, North Carolina; Closed
 Common Ground Golf Course; Aurora, Colorado
 High Pointe Golf Club; Williamsburg, MI; Closed
 Memorial Park Golf Course; Houston, TX
 Old Macdonald, one of the courses at Bandon Dunes Golf Resort; Bandon, Oregon
 Pacific Dunes, one of the courses at Bandon Dunes Golf Resort; Bandon, Oregon
 Pasatiempo Golf Club (restoration); Santa Cruz, CA
 Pinehurst No.10, Aberdeen, NC
 Quail Crossing Golf Club; Evansville, IN
 Riverfront Golf Club; Suffolk, Virginia
 Sand Valley (Lido), Wisconsin
 St Patrick's Links at Rosapenna Golf Resort, Ireland
 Streamsong Golf Course Blue; Central FL
 The Golf Club at St. Andrew's Beach; Rye, Victoria, Australia
 The Legends Golf Club; Heathlands Course; Myrtle Beach, SC
 The Loop at Forest Dunes, Roscommon, MI (Reversible 18 hole golf course)
 The Rawls Course at Texas Tech University; Lubbock, TX

Private courses
 Ballyneal; Holyoke, CO
 Dismal River; The Red Course; Mullen, NE
 Lost Dunes Golf Club; Bridgman, MI
 Rock Creek Cattle Company; Deer Lodge, MT
 Sebonack Golf Club; Southampton, New York (with Jack Nicklaus)
 Sedge Valley, Wisconsin (2024)
 Stone Eagle Golf Club; Palm Desert, CA
 Stonewall; North Course; Elverson, Pennsylvania
 Stonewall; Old Course; Elverson, Pennsylvania
 Tara Iti; New Zealand
 Te Arai North
 The Renaissance Club; Lothians, Scotland
 The Village Club; Sands Point, New York
 Tumble Creek at Suncadia; Cle Elum, WA

Golf Course (Restoration/Renovation)
 Camargo, Ohio
 Commonwealth, Victoria, Australia
 Dornick Hills, Oklahoma
 East Potomac, Washington D.C. (Future)
 Pasatiempo, California
 San Francisco Golf Club, California
 Valley Club of Montecito, California

References

External links
Golf by Tom Doak
Palm Spring Life interview
Renaissance Golf Design

Cornell University College of Agriculture and Life Sciences alumni
Golf course architects
American landscape architects
Living people
Year of birth missing (living people)